Jean-Daniel Nicoud (born 31 August 1938), is a Swiss computer scientist, noted for inventing of a computer mouse with an optical encoder and the CALM (Common Assembly Language for microprocessors).

He obtained a degree in physics at the École Polytechnique Fédérale de Lausanne (EPFL) in 1963. Around 1965, he became interested in logical systems. He obtained his PhD at the EPFL in 1970 and became a professor in 1973. 

His laboratory, LAMI (LAboratoire de Micro-Informatique), developed the Smaky computer, in addition to the optical computer mouse, an update of the traditional kinetic mouse invented by Douglas Engelbart. The Khepera mobile robot was also developed at the LAMI.

He left the EPFL in August 2000 and is actively innovating in his private company, DIDEL, especially in the area of miniature ultralight aircraft (below 10 g airplanes). His airplane was used in a publication that received a best paper award in IROS 2006 conference.

See also

References

Further reading
 Google scholar publication list

External links
Smaky history from A History of Computing in Switzerland
Prof. Jean-Daniel Nicoud @ EPFL
DIDEL - Slow flyers, microrobots and educational kits for technical schools and hobby roboticians

Swiss computer scientists
1938 births
Living people
Academic staff of the École Polytechnique Fédérale de Lausanne
École Polytechnique Fédérale de Lausanne alumni